John Miller (November 10, 1774March 31, 1862) was an American physician and politician from New York.

Life
He attended the district school and a private classical school in Kent, Connecticut. From 1793 on, he studied medicine, first with an uncle, then with Dr. Moshier in Easton, New York. In 1797, he went to Philadelphia and became a private pupil of Dr. Benjamin Rush, and attended Rush's and Dr. William Shippen's lectures at the University of Pennsylvania. In 1798, he returned to Easton and practiced in partnership with Dr. Moshier. Miller was licensed to practice medicine by the Vermont Medical Society in 1800, the law on licensing physicians not being enacted yet in the State of New York. In 1801, he removed to that part of the Town of Fabius which was split off as the Town of Truxton when Cortland County was established in 1808, and continued the practice of medicine there. In 1805, he married Phoebe (1779–1838), and they had eight children, among them Charles Miller MD (1816–1854).

He was Coroner of Cortland County from 1802 to 1805, Postmaster of Truxton from 1805 to 1825, a Justice of the Peace from 1812 to 1821, and an associate judge of the Cortland County Court from 1817 to 1820. He was a founding member of the Cortland County Medical Society in 1808, and was its first Vice President.

Miller was a member of the New York State Assembly in 1816–17, 1820 and 1846. He was elected as an Adams man to the Nineteenth United States Congress, holding office from March 4, 1825, to March 3, 1827. He was a delegate to the New York State Constitutional Convention of 1846.

Miller was buried at the City Cemetery in Truxton.

Sources

The New York Civil List compiled by Franklin Benjamin Hough (pages 58, 71, 192, 195, 231 and 292; Weed, Parsons and Co., 1858)
Transactions of the American Medical Association (Vol. 14, 1864; pages 202f)
Documents of the Senate of the State of New York (Vol. 5; pages 449ff)
Death notice of his son Charles, in NYT on January 12, 1854

External links

1774 births
1862 deaths
University of Pennsylvania alumni
19th-century American politicians
People from Amenia, New York
People from Truxton, New York
19th-century American physicians
Members of the New York State Assembly
New York (state) state court judges
National Republican Party members of the United States House of Representatives from New York (state)
People from Easton, New York